Kariyawad is a village near Pratapgarh, Rajasthan in Pratapgarh district (Rajasthan) of Rajasthan state of India.

References

Villages in Pratapgarh district, Rajasthan